The men's 800 metres event was part of the track and field athletics programme at the 1920 Summer Olympics. The competition was held from Sunday, August 15, 1920, to Tuesday, August 17, 1920. Forty runners from 17 nations competed. No nation had more than 4 runners, suggesting the limit had been reduced from the 12 maximum in force in 1908 and 1912. The event was won by Albert Hill of Great Britain, snapping a three-Games streak of American victories and starting a four-Games streak of British wins. Bevil Rudd, the 400 metres winner in 1920, took bronze to give South Africa its first medal in the 800 metres.

Background

This was the sixth appearance of the event, which is one of 12 athletics events to have been held at every Summer Olympics. None of the pre-war finalists from 1908 returned to the 800 metres (champion and world record holder Ted Meredith ran only in the 400 metres in 1920). Contenders included Bevil Rudd of South Africa, the 1920 AAA champion; Albert Hill of Great Britain, the 1919 AAA champion, and Earl Eby of the United States, the 1920 U.S. champion.

Belgium, Czechoslovakia, Estonia, Japan, Luxembourg, Monaco, Spain, and Switzerland appeared in the event for the first time. Great Britain and the United States each made their fifth appearance, tied for the most among all nations.

Competition format

The competition used the three-round format introduced in 1912, though the final expanded to nine runners for the first time. There were five quarterfinal heats of between 7 and 9 athletes each; the top four runners in each heat advanced to the semifinals. There were three semifinals with 6 or 7 athletes each; the top three runners in each semifinal advanced to the nine-man final.

Records

These were the standing world and Olympic records (in minutes) prior to the 1920 Summer Olympics.

No world or Olympic records were set during the competition.

Schedule

The semifinals and final were held on the same day, the final essentially immediately following the semifinals.

Results
Times were generally only published for the winners of each heat. Some of the times listed below are estimates based on contemporary reports of the races.

Round 1

Heat 1

Heat 2

Heat 3

Heat 4

Heat 5

Semifinals

Semifinal 1

Semifinal 2

Semifinal 3

Final
The first lap was led by Eby and Scott with Eby holding the lead at the halfway point of the race passing the 400m mark in 54.2 seconds. As the 2nd and final lap began Rudd took the lead and held it until the finishing straight where Hill and Eby passed him and battled each other until the end. Hill pulled ahead in the final meters to win Great Britain its 3rd gold medal in the 800m.

References

Further reading
 
 

800 metres
800 metres at the Olympics